Miami (also Romanized as Miami, Mayāmey, Maiāmai, and Meyāmey) is a village in Miami Rural District, Razaviyeh District, Mashhad County, Razavi Khorasan Province, Iran. At the 2006 census, its population was 634, in 150 families.

References 

Populated places in Mashhad County